Poul Mathias Thomsen (born in 1955, in Aabenraa) is a Danish economist working for the International Monetary Fund (IMF) since the 1980s. He is the director of the IMF's European Department. He led the bailouts of Iceland, Greece, Portugal and Ukraine during and after the Great Recession.

He is going to retire from the IMF in July 2020.

Reception in Europe

Greece 
He was referred as "Mr Blue Eyes" on Greek press. Because of his strict and wrong financial tactics for the people (as he insisted on implementing more taxes and cutting pensions and salaries), he became one of the most repugnant persons in Greece. He also raised concern on the Greek press on the amount of his pension that will receive as he retires in July.

References

External links

1955 births
Danish economists
Living people
People from Aabenraa Municipality